Tammy Lynn Michaels (née Doring), also known by the surname Etheridge from her relationship with Melissa Etheridge, is an American actress.

Michaels was a regular cast member on The WB's Popular.

Career
Michaels developed a passion for acting in junior high school, and after graduating, moved to New York City to pursue it. She attended the American Musical and Dramatic Academy and completed three semesters but withdrew from the school before graduation. While working as a bartender at a restaurant, she was discovered by Alayne Skylar, a talent scout.

After moving to Los Angeles, Michaels landed the role of Nicole Julian on Popular.

In 2002, Michaels guest-starred on the Fox show That '80s Show, followed by a guest appearance in 2004 on the Showtime drama The L Word. In 2005, she played the character Tess on the NBC series Committed.

In 2003, Michaels played the role of Max in the short-film D.E.B.S. The film received several awards and later was expanded to a feature-length film of the same name and released in 2004. However, most of the actresses in the original D.E.B.S. were replaced for the expanded version, including Michaels. In 2013, she was a part of Untold: a documentary about sexual assault survivors.

Personal life
Michaels is openly lesbian.

She started dating singer Melissa Etheridge in 2001, and the couple had a commitment ceremony in September 2003. They became registered domestic partners in 2005. In April 2006, the couple announced that Michaels was pregnant with twins. Michaels gave birth to a daughter and a son in October 2006.

On April 15, 2010, Michaels and Etheridge confirmed that they had ended their nearly nine-year relationship. In May 2012 it was announced that their two-year child support battle had been settled.

Since 2005, Michaels has kept a blog, in which she discusses politics, current events and her personal life.

Filmography

References

External links
 
 Hollywood Farm Girl (Michaels' blog)

American film actresses
American television actresses
American bloggers
American lesbian actresses
LGBT people from Indiana
Living people
Actresses from Indiana
People from Lafayette, Indiana
American women bloggers
21st-century American actresses
Year of birth missing (living people)